Liavek is a series of five fantasy anthologies edited by Emma Bull and Will Shetterly set in a shared world.

Orson Scott Card found the initial volume to be "an example of what can be accomplished [in a shared-world project] when almost everything goes right."

The collections were published by Ace Books with contributors including Bull, Shetterly, Gene Wolfe, Jane Yolen, John M. Ford, Kara Dalkey, Barry B. Longyear, Megan Lindholm, Nancy Kress, Patricia C. Wrede, Steven Brust, Nate Bucklin, Pamela Dean, Gregory Frost, Charles de Lint, Charles R. Saunders, Walter Jon Williams, Alan Moore and Bradley Denton. Related works, including a comic book,   have been brought out by other publishers.

Setting

Liavek
Located on the southern shore of the Sea of Luck at the mouth of the Cat River, Liavek is a hot, busy trade city.  Magic is present and based on a combination of 'birth luck' and the length of time one's mother was in labor.  Everyone is privy to some luck, but using it to their advantage is no easy feat.  On an annual basis, luck or magic must be invested in an object outside of oneself, and only then can it be used to power spells.  Investment is difficult and dangerous, while not investing luck and magic will result in the magic draining away.  This is more prevalent in magicians who will find their life drain away with the magic.

Works

Liavek
Edited by Will Shetterly and Emma Bull, published by Ace Books in 1985

 Badu's Luck - Emma Bull
 The Green Rabbit from S'Rian - Gene Wolfe
 Ancient Curses - Patricia C. Wrede
 Birth Luck - Nancy Kress
 An Act of Contrition - Steven Brust
 The Inn of the Demon Camel - Jane Yolen
 The Hands of the Artist - Kara Dalkey
 The Green Cat - Pamela Dean
 A Coincidence of Birth - Megan Lindholm
 Bound Things - Will Shetterly
 The Fortune Maker - Barry B. Longyear

Liavek: The Players of Luck
Edited by Shetterly and Bull, published by Ace Books in 1986

 A Happy Birthday - Will Shetterly
 Before the Paint is Dry - Kara Dalkey
 The Rat's Alley Shuffle - Charles de Lint
 Two Houses in Saltigos - Pamela Dean
 Rikiki and the Wizard - Patricia C. Wrede
 Dry Well - Nathan A. Bucklin
 Choice of the Black Goddess - Gene Wolfe
 The Ballad of the Quick Levars (song) - Jane Yolen and Adam Stemple
 Pot Luck - Megan Lindholm
 Show of Faith - Gregory Frost
 An Act of Trust - Steven Brust
 Ishu's Gift - Charles R. Saunders
 A Cup of Worrynot Tea - John M. Ford
 The Well-Made Plan - Emma Bull

Liavek: Wizard’s Row
Edited by Shetterly and Bull, published by Ace Books in 1987
 An Act of Mercy - Megan Lindholm and Steven Brust
 Green Is the Color - John M. Ford
 Paint the Meadows with Delight - Pamela Dean
 The World in the Rock - Kara Dalkey
 Baker’s Dozen - Bradley Denton
 Cenedwine Brocade - Caroline Stevermer
 A Hypothetical Lizard - Alan Moore
 Training Ground - Nancy Kress
 City of Luck (song) - Jane Yolen and Adam Stemple
 The Ballad of the Quick Levars (song) - Jane Yolen and Adam Stemple
 Eel Island Shoals (song) - John M. Ford
 Pot-Boil Blues (song) - John M. Ford
 A Handbook for the Apprentice Magician

Liavek: Spells of Binding
Edited by Shetterly and Bull, published by Ace Books in 1988

 Riding the Hammer - John M. Ford
 Portrait of Vengeance - Kara Dalkey
 The Skin and Knife Game - Lee Barwood and Charles de Lint
 Strings Attached - Nathan A. Bucklin
 The Last Part of the Tragical History of Acrilat - Pamela Dean
 Mad God - Patricia C. Wrede
 The Tale of the Stuffed Levar - Jane Yolen
 An Act of Love - Steven Brust, Gregory Frost and Megan Lindholm
 Spells of Binding (poem) - Pamela Dean

Liavek: Festival Week
Edited by Shetterly and Bull, published by Ace Books in 1990

 Consequences - Walter Jon Williams
 As Bright as New Coppers - Bradley Denton
 The Grand Festival: Sestina (poem) - John M. Ford
 Divination Day: Invocation (poem) - John M. Ford
  A Hot Night at Cheeky's - Steven Brust
 Birth Day: Sonnet (poem) - John M. Ford
 A Prudent Obedience - Kara Dalkey
 Procession Day/Remembrance Night: Processonal/Recessional (poem) - John M. Ford
 A Necessary End - Pamela Dean
 Bazaar Day: Ballad (poem) - John M. Ford
 The True Tale of Count Dashif's Demise - Jane Yolen
 Festival Day: Catechism (poem) - John M. Ford
 Six Days Outside the Year - Will Shetterly
 The Levar's Night Out - Patricia C. Wrede
 Restoration Day: Plainsong - John M. Ford

Casting Fortune
In 1989 Tor Books published Casting Fortune, a collection of short stories by John M. Ford - this brought together his stories from the second and third volumes of Liavek together with a new novella in the Liavek shared world. The stories are:
 A Cup of Worrynot Tea
 Green Is the Color
 The Illusionist

Other appearances
Moore's Liavek story was adapted into comic book format and published as Alan Moore's Hypothetical Lizard in 2005.

Cousins, by Dean appears in the 2006 anthology from Firebird Books, Firebirds Rising, edited by Sharyn November

Some stories set in the world of Liavek appear in the anthology Book of Enchantments written by Patricia C. Wrede.

On May 12th, 2015, Diversion Publishing released Points of Departure: Liavek Stories; republishing a collection of short stories set in the world of Liavek, by Pamela Dean and Patricia C Wrede.

Licensing
In 2017, Shetterly announced that he and Bull were allowing the use of the Liavek setting at no cost, for works earning less than $3000, subject to certain conditions.

References

Fantasy worlds